John Paul Cusack (born June 28, 1966) is an American actor, producer, screenwriter and political activist. He is a son of filmmaker Dick Cusack, and his older sisters are actresses Joan and Ann Cusack.

Cusack began acting in films during the 1980s, starring in coming-of-age dramedies such as The Sure Thing (1985), Better Off Dead (1985), and Say Anything... (1989). He then started appearing in independent films such as Eight Men Out (1988), The Grifters (1990), True Colors (1991), and Bullets Over Broadway (1994). Cusack began appearing as a leading man in such film as the comedic films Grosse Pointe Blank (1997), the action thriller Con Air (1997), the animated musical Anastasia (1997), the psychological drama Being John Malkovich (1999), and the romantic comedies High Fidelity (2000), America's Sweethearts (2001), Serendipity (2001), and Must Love Dogs (2005). He also starred in Runaway Jury (2003), Grace Is Gone (2007), Martian Child (2007),  Hot Tub Time Machine (2010), The Butler (2013), Maps to the Stars (2014), and Chi-Raq (2015). He portrayed Brian Wilson in the critically acclaimed musical biopic Love and Mercy (2015).

Early life 
Cusack was born in Evanston, Illinois into an Irish Catholic family. His parents are writer-actor-producer and documentary filmmaker Richard J. "Dick" Cusack (1925–2003), originally from New York City, and Ann Paula "Nancy" (née Carolan) Cusack (1929-2022), originally from Massachusetts, a former mathematics teacher and political activist.  John's older sisters, Ann and Joan, are also actors. Cusack has two other siblings, Bill and Susie. The family moved from Manhattan, New York, to Illinois and were friends of activist Philip Berrigan. Cusack graduated from Evanston Township High School in 1984, where he met Jeremy Piven, and spent a year at New York University before dropping out, saying that he had "too much fire in his belly".

Career 

Cusack began acting in films in the early 1980s. He made his breakout role in Rob Reiner's The Sure Thing (1985). He also starred in Cameron Crowe's directorial debut film, Say Anything... (1989). Cusack played a con artist in Stephen Frears' 1990 neo-noir film The Grifters. After establishing New Crime Productions, Cusack co-wrote the screenplay for and starred in George Armitage's crime film Grosse Pointe Blank (1997), in which he played an assassin who goes to his 10-year high school reunion to win back his high school sweetheart.

In Spike Jonze's fantasy film Being John Malkovich (1999), Cusack played a puppeteer who finds a portal leading into the mind of the eponymous actor, John Malkovich. The film was nominated for three Academy Awards, including Best Director (Jonze), Best Original Screenplay (Charlie Kaufman) and Best Supporting Actress (Catherine Keener). Cusack was nominated for a Golden Globe Award for Best Actor – Motion Picture Musical or Comedy for his performance in High Fidelity (2000), based on Nick Hornby's novel, and also appeared in America's Sweethearts (2001), Serendipity (2001), Identity (2003), Runaway Jury (2003), Must Love Dogs (2005), The Ice Harvest (2005), The Contract (2006), Grace Is Gone (2007), 1408 (2007), Martian Child (2007), War, Inc. (2008).

Cusack starred as Jackson Curtis in Roland Emmerich's epic disaster film 2012 (2009), a struggling novelist who attempts to save his family during a global cataclysm.

Cusack also played Edgar Allan Poe in James McTeigue's biopic film The Raven (2012) and starred in David Cronenberg's Maps to the Stars (2014).

Later, he starred in video on demand films, including The Factory, The Numbers Station, The Frozen Ground, Grand Piano (2013), Drive Hard (2014), The Prince (2014), Reclaim (2014), Cell (2016), Arsenal (2017), Blood Money (2017), and Singularity (2017).

In 2014, Cusack criticized Hollywood saying the mega-corporations have stepped in with 50-producer movies, franchises are king, and stars are used as leverage. He called Hollywood, "a whorehouse and people go mad."

Political activism 

He is anti-war, having tweeted, "Being anti-war — is pro-troops — pro-human". Between 2005 and 2009, Cusack wrote blogs for The Huffington Post, which included an interview with Naomi Klein. He voiced his opposition to the war in Iraq and Bush's administration, calling the government's worldview "depressing, corrupt, unlawful, and tragically absurd". He also appeared in a June 2008 MoveOn.org advertisement, where he said that George W. Bush and John McCain had the same governing priorities.

Cusack criticized the Obama administration for its drone policy in the Middle East and its support of the National Defense Authorization Act, and became one of the initial supporters of the Freedom of the Press Foundation in 2012. In June 2015, he stated in an interview with The Daily Beast that "when you talk about drones, the American Empire, the NSA, civil liberties, attacks on journalism and whistleblowers, [Obama] is as bad or worse than Bush". He later criticized the publication for misquoting him in order to make an interesting headline.

In 2015, Cusack, Daniel Ellsberg and Arundhati Roy met Edward Snowden, who had fled the US because of his leaks of classified information surrounding illegal population surveillance, at a Moscow hotel room. This meeting was converted into a book co-authored with Roy titled Things That Can and Cannot Be Said.

Cusack endorsed Senator Bernie Sanders in his 2016 and 2020 presidential bids. He is a member of the Democratic Socialists of America.

During the 2014 Israel Gaza conflict, Cusack supported the Palestinians on social media. He tweeted from the region a number of pro-Gaza articles. One tweet read, "Bombing people who can't escape not [sic] defense – does not mean one supports Hamas means to be against murder as solution to political problem."

In 2018, after Lorde cancelled performances in Israel after a request from the BDS movement, Cusack was among more than a hundred writers, actors, director, and musicians who signed a letter defending Lorde's freedom of conscience.

In June 2019, Cusack wrote a tweet featuring an image of a large fist with a blue Star of David crushing a small crowd of people next to a quote often misattributed to Voltaire: "To learn who rules over you, simply find out who you are not allowed to criticize". The quote is in reality a comment by the white supremacist and neo-Nazi Kevin Alfred Strom. In the tweet, Cusack added the words "Follow the money." He later blamed it on a "bot," then defended it, then apologized and deleted the tweet.

Personal life 
Cusack trained in kickboxing under former world kickboxing champion Benny Urquidez for over twenty years. He began training under Urquidez in preparation for his role in Say Anything... and holds the rank of a level six black belt in Urquidez's Ukidokan Kickboxing system.

In March 2008, police arrested Emily Leatherman outside Cusack's Malibu, California home for stalking him. On October 10, 2008, Leatherman pleaded no contest and received five years' probation and mandatory psychiatric counseling, and was ordered to stay away from Cusack, his home, and business for the next ten years.

When asked in 2009 why he had never married, Cusack answered, "Society doesn't tell me what to do."

Filmography

Film

Television

Awards and nominations

References

Further reading 
 Barnes, Henry (September 26, 2014). "John Cusack: 'Hollywood is a whorehouse and people go mad. The Guardian. Accessed February 27, 2015.
 Robinson, Tasha (November 27, 2007). "John Cusack" (interview). The A.V. Club.

External links 

 
 

1966 births
20th-century American male actors
21st-century American male actors
American anti–Iraq War activists
American bloggers
American male bloggers
American film producers
American male kickboxers
American male film actors
American male screenwriters
American male television actors
American male voice actors
American people of Irish descent
Television producers from Illinois
Best Supporting Actor Genie and Canadian Screen Award winners
Cusack family (United States)
Evanston Township High School alumni
Living people
Male actors from Chicago
Male actors from Evanston, Illinois
Tisch School of the Arts alumni
Writers from Chicago
Screenwriters from Illinois
Members of the Democratic Socialists of America
Former Roman Catholics